Keith Alexander McKenzie (26 April 1922 – 8 January 2018) was an Australian rules footballer who played for North Melbourne in the Victorian Football League (VFL).

Family
The son of Thomas Frederick McKenzie (1896–1955) and Olive Frances McKenzie (1896–1991), née Solly, Keith Alexander McKenzie was born at South Melbourne on 26 April 1922.

War Service
McKenzie enlisted to serve in the Royal Australian Air Force with his parents' permission in June 1941, aged 19. He served in Darwin and then New Guinea as a flight rigger with the 77th Squadron before moving back to Melbourne so serve at the 1st Aircraft Depot at Laverton in early 1944.

Football
McKenzie started his football career with the North Melbourne Colts before he enlisted, and joined North Melbourne at the start of the 1944 season. He won the Syd Barker Medal, awarded to North Melbourne's best and fairest player for the season, in his third year at the club and went on to represent Victoria five times. 

After finishing his playing career, McKenzie went on to coach both North Melbourne and Carlton.

References

External links

Keith McKenzie's playing statistics from The VFA Project

1922 births
2018 deaths
North Melbourne Football Club players
North Melbourne Football Club coaches
Carlton Football Club coaches
Moorabbin Football Club players
Syd Barker Medal winners
Australian rules footballers from Melbourne
People from South Melbourne
Military personnel from Melbourne